The 2018 Open de Biarritz was a professional tennis tournament played on outdoor clay courts. It was the sixteenth edition of the tournament and was part of the 2018 ITF Women's Circuit. It took place in Biarritz, France, on 10–16 September 2018.

Singles main draw entrants

Seeds 

 1 Rankings as of 27 August 2018.

Other entrants 
The following players received a wildcard into the singles main draw:
  Timea Bacsinszky
  Chloé Paquet
  Jessika Ponchet
  Harmony Tan

The following player received entry using a protected ranking:
  Alexandra Panova

The following players received entry by special exempts:
  Paula Ormaechea
  Kimberley Zimmermann

The following players received entry from the qualifying draw:
  Marine Partaud
  Olga Sáez Larra
  Isabella Shinikova
  Rebecca Šramková

Champions

Singles

 Tamara Korpatsch def.  Timea Bacsinszky, 6–2, 7–5

Doubles

 Irina Bara /  Valentyna Ivakhnenko def.  Ysaline Bonaventure /  Hélène Scholsen, 6–4, 6–1

External links 
 2018 Engie Open de Biarritz at ITFtennis.com
 Official website

2018 ITF Women's Circuit
2018 in French tennis
Open de Biarritz